Camille Dimmer (born 20 April 1939) is a Luxembourg former professional footballer and politician.  By profession, he was an engineer.

Football career
Dimmer played for the Luxembourg national team a number of times, most prominently during the country's giant-killing run in the 1964 European Nations' Cup, during which Luxembourg came close to reaching the final four.  Dimmer scored both goals in the second leg of the second round, against the Netherlands, to put Luxembourg through to the quarter-finals against Denmark, which Luxembourg lost in a replay after being tied after two legs.

Political career
After his football career, Dimmer went into politics, sitting in the Chamber of Deputies for the Christian Social People's Party (CSV) from 1984 until 1994.  Dimmer was General Secretary of the CSV from 1990 until 1995.  He held the position of substitute member of the Parliamentary Assembly of the Council of Europe from 1989 to 1994.  After leaving the Chamber, he was appointed an honorary member, and is currently the President of the Association of Former Deputies.

Footnotes

External links
  Chamber of Deputies official webpage on Camille Dimmer
 
 

1939 births
Living people
People from Clervaux
Luxembourgian footballers
Association football forwards
Luxembourg international footballers
R.S.C. Anderlecht players
K.V.V. Crossing Elewijt players
FA Red Boys Differdange players
Belgian Pro League players
Luxembourgian expatriate footballers
Expatriate footballers in Belgium
Luxembourgian expatriate sportspeople in Belgium
Luxembourgian engineers
Christian Social People's Party politicians
Members of the Chamber of Deputies (Luxembourg)
Luxembourgian sportsperson-politicians